José Manuel Morales Ramos (born 19 February 1991) is a Spanish footballer who plays as a right back.

Club career
Born in Seville, Andalusia, Morales finished his youth career with Sevilla FC's academy. He made his professional debut with the reserves on 16 November 2008, starting in a 0–2 home loss against Elche CF in the Segunda División.

In July 2012, Morales signed with another reserve team, Getafe CF B of the Segunda División B. The following season, he joined fellow league club CD Toledo. 

Morales continued to compete in the lower divisions the following years, representing CD Toledo, CP Cacereño, CD Alcalá, Arcos CF and CF Sant Rafel, aside from a spell at Gibraltar's Europa FC.

References

External links

1991 births
Living people
Footballers from Seville
Spanish footballers
Association football defenders
Segunda División players
Segunda División B players
Tercera División players
Sevilla Atlético players
Getafe CF B players
CD Toledo players
CP Cacereño players
CD Alcalá players
Gibraltar Premier Division players
Europa F.C. players
Spanish expatriate footballers
Expatriate footballers in Gibraltar
Spanish expatriate sportspeople in Gibraltar